Henry Hugh Peter Deasy (29 Jun 1866 – 24 Jan 1947) was an Irish army officer, founder of the Deasy Motor Car Company and a writer.

Career
He was born in Dublin, the only surviving son of Rickard Deasy, justice of the Court of Appeal in Ireland, and Monica O'Connor.

He served as a British Army officer. mostly in India, between 1888 and 1897, when he retired.

After his army service, he became one of the first westerners to write a detailed account of Tibet, covering his travels between 1897 and 1899. He also provided photographs for a book by Percy W. Church.

In 1903 he helped promote the Rochet-Schneider Company by driving a car from London to Moscow non-stop. He also drove a Martini up a mountain rock railway near Montreux, Switzerland. At this time H H P Deasy and Co. was formed to import both Rochet-Schneider and Martini cars into the UK. In 1906 The Deasy Motor Car Manufacturing Co. was formed, and took over the factory formerly used by the Iden Car Co. at Parkside, Coventry. On 9 March 1908 Deasy resigned, after a dispute with the car's designer Edmund W Lewis.

In 1913, as a member of the council of the Roads Improvement Association, he formulated a scheme for a standard type of direction post and plate for adoption by highway authorities.

He married Dolores Hickie, daughter of Colonel James Hickie and his wife Lucilla Larios y Tashara, and sister of Sir William Hickie. They had three children, including the agricultural campaigner Rickard Deasy.

Works
In Tibet and Chinese Turkestan; vol. 1

References

Sources
 Henry Hugh Peter Deasy - In Tibet and Chinese Turkestan: Being the record of three years' exploration, London: T. Fisher Unwin, January 1, 1901 
 Percy W. Church - Chinese Turkestan with Caravan and Rifle London: Rivingstons, 1901 (includes photographs by Deasy)

External links
 Brief history of Armstrong Siddeley Motor Co.

British automotive pioneers
Royal Munster Fusiliers officers
16th The Queen's Lancers officers
Engineers from Dublin (city)
Explorers of Central Asia
Explorers of Tibet
1866 births
1947 deaths